Laurinda Hope Spear, FAIA, ASLA, LEED AP (born 1950) is an American architect and landscape architect based in Miami, Florida.  She is one of the founders of Arquitectonica, the international architecture, planning, and interior design firm, which formed in 1977. In 2005, in order to further explore sustainable design principles, she co-founded ArquitectonicaGEO (ArqGEO), a landscape architecture, master planning and urban design firm.

Early life
Spear was born in 1950 and has lived in Miami throughout her life. She is the eldest of three children. Her father, Harold Spear was a surgeon.  In 1968 she graduated from Everglades School and in 1972 received her Bachelor of Fine Arts from Brown University, where she later served as a trustee for six years. She received her Master of Architecture from Columbia University in 1975 and a Master of Landscape Architecture from Florida International University in 2006. Spear was awarded the Rome Prize in Architecture in 1978. In 1992, she was made a Fellow of the American Institute of Architects. In 1999, she was inducted into the Interior Design Magazine Hall of Fame. After years of practicing Architecture she returned to school to pursue a Master of Landscape Architecture at Florida International University which she completed in 2006.

Career
Spear co-founded Arquitectonica in 1977 with fellow architects Bernardo Fort-Brescia, Andres Duany, Elizabeth Plater-Zyberk, and Hervin Romney. In its early years, the Miami-based firm created a number of colorful, geometrically inspired structures — including the Pink House and the Atlantis that quickly became iconic. Spear also introduced a new style of interiors into many of the Arquitectonica buildings, and this move spurred the introduction/development of her line of products for international firms such as Brayton, Wolf Gordon, and Hunter Douglas.

Spear made a contribution as an outside designer for The Modern Fan Company in 2000 before being released to the market in 2001. She brought her taste and creativity to their collection with the innovative glass fan, the "Whirlybird".

After two decades, Spear’s interest shifted dramatically to nature and the interaction between a building and its site and context. “I felt there was something unconscionable about the way architecture was often ignoring the site, even thinking that it wasn’t necessary to visit. About fifteen years ago, I thought, to do it right, you’d have to be a landscape architect as well.” Returning to school, she obtained her master’s in landscape architecture and her license and founded ArqGEO in 2005.

This young firm is a collaborative studio whose projects stem from a broad and deep continuum drawn from Spear’s previous body of work. The intention of blurring the line between building architecture and landscape architecture is embraced and encouraged in every project that ArqGEO undertakes.

Spear works differently now than she did during the early days of Arquitectonica.” I prioritize how the building fits into the site, and I prioritize the site over the building.” GEO is a collaborative studio working on large and small projects with the main purpose of creating resilient landscapes that address our current crisis’: climate change, pandemics, the adversity and inequities faced by people of color in the United States, and around the world.

Spear believes that it is incumbent upon us to rethink our role and the role of nature in this new world context and to ensure that green places are accessible to all. “Planting more trees is what will make a difference.”

“Every project that we do in GEO is about elevating landscape — we’re always thinking of resilience, things that will work in the years to come.”

Writings
Later in 2020, Spear will release a book titled, GEO BIO MIAMI designed by Irma Boom which addresses many of the topics that interest Spear: green infrastructure, climate change, storm water management, and most importantly, the quantifiable and non-quantifiable value that landscape architecture brings to a project. As Charles Birnbaum eloquently states in the introduction of the new book: “GEO’s work establishes – and broadcasts- the young firm’s holistic approach to the site, and its context, by deploying an arsenal of ideas that leveraged the art and science of landscape architecture”.

Personal life
Spear is married to Bernardo Fort Brescia. They live and work in Coconut Grove, Florida.

References

External links
 Arquitectonica website
 ArqGEO website

1950 births
Brown University alumni
Columbia Graduate School of Architecture, Planning and Preservation alumni
Architects from Miami
American landscape architects
American designers
Living people
Fellows of the American Institute of Architects
American women architects
Florida International University alumni
Brescia family
21st-century American women
Arquitectonica people